Tomasz Fornal (born 31 August 1997) is a Polish professional volleyball player. He is a member of the Poland national team, a silver medalist at the 2022 World Championship, and the 2021 Polish Champion. At the professional club level, he plays for Jastrzębski Węgiel in the Polish PlusLiga.

Career

Junior career
He started playing volleyball at the 22 UKS (Students' Sport Club) run by the Elementary School No. 155 in Kraków. He then represented Hutnik Dobry Wynik volleyball club while attending Junior High School No. 46 in Kraków. He subsequently entered the youth squad of PGE Skra Bełchatów and won bronze medal at the Polish Junior Championships with the team.

Senior career
In 2016, he made his debut in PlusLiga, Poland's highest level professional volleyball league, by joining Czarni Radom. In 2019, he changed his club and joined Jastrzębski Węgiel with which he won the 2021 Polish Championship and the 2022 Polish SuperCup.

National team
On 12 April 2015, the Polish national team, including Fornal, won a title of the U19 European Champions. They beat Italy in the final (3–1). He took part in the 2015 European Youth Olympic Festival, and on 1 August 2015 achieved a gold medal after the final match with Bulgaria (3–0). On 23 August 2015, Poland achieved its first title of the U19 World Champions. In the final his team beat hosts – Argentina (3–2).

On 10 September 2016, he achieved a title of the U20 European Champion after winning 7 out of 7 matches at the tournament, and beating Ukraine in the final (3–1). On 2 July 2017, Poland, including Fornal, achieved a title of the U21 World Champions after beating Cuba in the final (3–0). His national team won 47 matches in the row and never lost.

In 2022, he won bronze medal with the national team at the 2022 FIVB Nations League in Bologna, Italy. The same year, he won silver medal at the 2022 FIVB World Championship jointly held in Poland and Slovenia losing in the final to Italy 1–3.

Personal life
His father, Marek is a former volleyball player, a two–time Polish Champion (1988, 1989) with Hutnik Nowa Huta. He has an older brother, Jan (born 1995), who also plays volleyball professionally.

Honours

Clubs
 National championships
 2020/2021  Polish Championship, with Jastrzębski Węgiel
 2021/2022  Polish SuperCup, with Jastrzębski Węgiel
 2021/2022  Polish Championship, with Jastrzębski Węgiel
 2022/2023  Polish SuperCup, with Jastrzębski Węgiel

Youth national team
 2014  CEV U20 European Championship
 2015  CEV U19 European Championship
 2015  European Youth Olympic Festival
 2015  FIVB U19 World Championship
 2016  CEV U20 European Championship
 2017  FIVB U21 World Championship

Individual awards
 2014: CEV U20 European Championship – Best Receiver
 2017: Młoda Liga – Most Valuable Player
 2021: Polish SuperCup – Most Valuable Player

References

External links

 
 Player profile at PlusLiga.pl  
 Player profile at Volleybox.net

1997 births
Living people
Sportspeople from Kraków
Polish men's volleyball players
Czarni Radom players
Jastrzębski Węgiel players
Outside hitters